Denisovo is a rural locality (a village) in Denisovskoye Rural Settlement, Gorokhovetsky District, Vladimir Oblast, Russia. The population was 34 as of 2010.

Geography 
Denisovo is located 30 km southwest of Gorokhovets (the district's administrative centre) by road. Lesnoye-Tatarintsevo is the nearest rural locality.

References 

Rural localities in Gorokhovetsky District